MV Odyssey (formerly Alucia) is a 56-meter research and exploration vessel that facilitates a wide range of diving, submersible and aerial operations. The ship is currently used by OCEEF, and was previously utilized by initiative OceanX for ocean exploration, research and filming missions.

History
Odyssey was built as a heavy lift ship with a launch platform for diving and submersible operations in 1974 in Auroux, France as the RV Nadir. In 1984 it was purchased by the French oceanographic institute IFREMER and in 2004 by DeepOcean Quest. It was subsequently purchased by Bridgewater Associates founder Ray Dalio to support and facilitate ocean exploration and research. In 2012, Mark Dalio founded Alucia Productions (now OceanX Media) to film and chronicle ocean exploration and research missions aboard the Alucia.

Features 
The ship also has an A-star helicopter and helipad; dry and wet science labs; 8K Red cameras, low-light submersible cameras and custom underwater camera housings; and a media room.

Missions 
Notable missions aboard Odyssey have included:
 The 2011 search for Air France Flight 447 
 Filming of David Attenborough's Emmy Award-winning series Great Barrier Reef 
 Filming of BBC Earth's Blue Planet II (with OceanX Media) 
 Capturing the first-ever footage of the Giant Squid
 Exploring the ocean's blue holes for the Emmy Award-winning series Years of Living Dangerously

References

External links
 OCEEF
Alucia OceanX

Research vessels of France
Ships of the Marshall Islands
1974 ships